The 1979–80 Segunda División B was the 3rd season of Segunda División B, the third highest level of the Spanish football league system, since its establishment in 1977. First and 2nd in each group were promoted to Segunda División, and the bottom four were relegated to the Tercera División.

Group 1

A total of 20 teams will contest the group, including 2 relegated from the Segunda División and 4 promoted from the Tercera División.

Promotion and relegation
Teams relegated from 1978–79 Segunda División
 Baracaldo CF
 Racing de Ferrol
Teams promoted from 1978–79 Tercera División
 Las Palmas Atlético
 Sporting Atlético
 Arenas de Guecho
 CD Guecho

Teams
Teams from Aragon, Asturias, Basque Provinces, Canary Islands, Galicia, León, New Castile and Old Castile.

League table

 Sporting Atlético was called CD Gijón until last season.

Results

Top goalscorers

Top goalkeepers

Group 2

A total of 20 teams will contest the group, including 2 relegated from the Segunda División and 4 promoted from the Tercera División.

Promotion and relegation
Teams relegated from 1978–79 Segunda División
 Terrassa FC
 Real Jaén
Teams promoted from 1978–79 Tercera División
 CD San Fernando
 CD Eldense
 UD Vall de Uxó

Teams
Teams from Andalusia, Balearic Islands, Catalonia, Extremadura, New Castile and Valencia.

League table

 Terrassa FC was called Tarrasa CF until last season.									
 UD San Andrés was called CD San Andrés until last season.

Results

Top goalscorers

Top goalkeepers

External links
 RFEF Site

Segunda División B seasons
3
Spain